Dreevay is a television magazine show in Trinidad and Tobago.  It features TV personality, Reagan Des Vignes who visits local and international hotspots.  The show airs on Tuesday Nights at 8pm on Gayelle TV in Trinidad & Tobago.

The word "dreevay" is patois for "knocking about".  Reagan, in essence, knocks about from hotspot to hotspot just to give the viewers a glimpse of what Trinidad and Tobago, and the region, is all about.

Dreevay also encompasses parodies on other programs during the Tuesday night programme. Dreevay's Next Top Synergistic Soca Model with Tyra Blank season featured judges Tyra Blank (Cherane Peters) who is Reagan's housemate, Twiggy Abdul (Giselle Thompson-Lowe), and Janice Cowell (Indra Ramcharan) a regular co-host on Dreevay. The winner of season 1 of DNTSSM was Saucy Aww an outspoken Diva who was up against Cry Baby JJ in the final.

The second Season of DNTSSM features an array of judges all parodying different people in local and international pop culture, but Tyra Blank and Janice Cowell have stayed on as judges in this season.

The third season of the parody commences on Dreevay's New Season in April 2009.

Trinidad and Tobago television series